Markus LaJuan Bailey (born March 7, 1997) is an American football linebacker for the Cincinnati Bengals of the National Football League (NFL). He played college football at Purdue.

College career
After playing at Hilliard Davidson High School, Bailey committed to Purdue on July 13, 2014, choosing the Boilermakers over Akron, Duke, Indiana, Pittsburgh, and West Virginia, among others, although an elusive offer from Ohio State never came.

After being sidelined by a torn ACL during his true  freshman season, Bailey started 13 games in each of his redshirt sophomore and junior seasons. After his junior season, Bailey was named second-team all-Big Ten by coaches and third-team all-Big Ten by the media. A knee injury ended Bailey's senior season after two games. He was named a team captain during his junior and senior seasons.

Professional career

Bailey was selected by the Cincinnati Bengals with the 215th overall pick in the seventh round of the 2020 NFL Draft. He was placed on the active/non-football injury list on July 27, 2020. He was moved back to the active roster on August 2.

Personal life
Bailey was named all-Academic Big Ten his redshirt freshman, sophomore, and junior seasons.

References

External links
Cincinnati Bengals bio
Purdue Boilermakers bio

1997 births
Living people
Players of American football from Columbus, Ohio
American football linebackers
Purdue Boilermakers football players
Cincinnati Bengals players